North Island is a small granitic island (2.01 km2) in the Seychelles.

Geography
The island is one of the Seychelles' 42 inner islands. The island has four beaches; East Beach, West Beach (or Grande Anse), Honeymoon Cove, and Dive Beach. The highest point of the island is 180 m. The perimeter measures in at 7.55 km, and the area is 2.01 km2

History
North Island was the first Seychelles island to record a landing by seafarers. An expedition in 1609 by Captain Sharpeigh and the crew of the English East India Company vessel Ascension reported that the island had a large population of giant land tortoises.

From 1826 until the 1970s, North Island was owned by the Beaufond family from Réunion. During this time, the island had a plantation for growing fruits and spices, as well as producing guano, fish oil and copra. After the plantation was sold in the 1970s, the island fell into disuse, and was taken over by feral animals and alien species of weeds.

In 1981, North Island was given to Marius Maier by his father. He intended to return the island to its former pristine state before human settlers arrived, including the removal of many unwanted animal and plant species, including pigs, rats, coconuts, casuarina, cows, Indian mynah birds, cats and a very intrusive weed called lantana.

He re-introduced the Seychelles' natural flora & fauna, including giant tortoises, certain birds, and trees such as takamaka, badamier and the famous coco-de-mer palm. 
in 1982, Marius Maier and the villagers have established a turtle nest monitoring center.

In 1997, North Island was purchased for US$5 million by Wilderness Holdings Limited, an ecotourism company from South Africa.
They have opened a private resort in 2003, aiming at the eco-tourism market, with 11 private villas. The resort has developed the island and increased its population.

North Island stood in for Tracy Island in the 2004 live-action adaptation of Thunderbirds.

In May 2011, it was the site for the royal honeymoon of the Duke and Duchess of Cambridge.

Politics
The island is part of La Digue and Inner Islands district, it was part of Silhouette district until it was dissolved in 1977 following the decline in copra production on this group of islands.

Economics
Most of the population are employed in the tourism business.
Accommodations reserved for the permanent staff are located near the island's center.

Facilities

The buildings of the island are either renovated coral buildings or were built from the removal of the unwanted trees on the island, during Marius Maier plan. The resort has 10 standard villas, and a special excluded (Villa North). 
A gym is in the village, a huge spa, library, restaurant.
The resort also features a boutique, a dive center, a main pool, and a bar.

Tourism
The island has many activities. mountain biking, scuba diving, kayaking and deep sea fishing. 
The resort offers a unique dining concept: the chef discusses guests' likes and dislikes upon arrival and bases available ingredients on this information. All food on North Island is either grown in the organic vegetable gardens, reared on the island, or caught fresh from the sea.

Gallery

References 

Islands of La Digue and Inner Islands